This is an incomplete list that briefly describes vertebrates that were extant during the Maastrichtian, a stage of the Late Cretaceous Period which extended from 72.1 to 66 million years before present. This was the last time period in which non-avian dinosaurs, pterosaurs, plesiosaurs, and mosasaurs existed.

Amphibians

Dinosaurs

†Ornithischians

†Ankylosaurs

†Parksosauridae

†Ornithopoda

†Ceratopsians

†Pachycephalosaurs

†Sauropods

†Theropods (non-maniraptoran)

†Maniraptora (non-avian)

Avialans (avian theropods)

Cartilaginous fish

Crocodylomorphs

Ray-finned fish

Mammals

†Plesiosaurs

†Pterosaurs

Squamates

Turtles

†Choristoderes

References

See also 
 List of fossil sites (with link directory)
 Cretaceous–Paleogene extinction event

Maastrichtian